Florencio Torres Ramirez (October 29, 1915 – April 12, 1995) was a Guamanian politician who was a Democratic senator in 12 Guam Legislatures and as Speaker of the 11th and 12th Guam Legislatures.

Early life

Guam Legislature

Elections
Ramirez was first elected to the Guam Legislature on the November 9, 1950, election. He was reelected and served to 11 subsequent terms in the Guam Legislature.

Leadership positions
Speaker, 11th Guam Legislature
Speaker, 12th Guam Legislature

Delegate to the Democratic National Convention
Ramirez represented Guam as a Delegate to the Democratic National Convention in 1964 and 1972.

Death

See also
 Guam Legislature
 Democratic Party of Guam

References

Chamorro people
Guamanian Democrats
Guamanian people of Spanish descent
Members of the Legislature of Guam
Speakers of the Legislature of Guam
1915 births
1995 deaths
20th-century American politicians